Ishøj is a Danish town with a population of 21,095 (1. January 2022). It is situated in the Region Hovedstaden, and is the seat of the Ishøj Municipality.

Geography
The town is located by the coast in the southwestern suburban area of Copenhagen and is part of the city's urban area.

Notable people
 Karen Ankersted (1859 in Ishøj – 1921) a Danish teacher and pioneering female politician. 
 Helle Thorning-Schmidt (born 1966) former Prime Minister of Denmark and Chief Executive of Save the Children, attended Ishøj Gymnasium
 Pia Olsen Dyhr (born 1971) a Danish politician who attended Ishøj Gymnasium
 Nadia Alawa (born 1971 in Ishøj) the founder and current CEO of the non-profit NuDay
 Peter Corp Dyrendal (born 1976 in Ishøj) a Danish-Thai descent singer, recording artist, actor and model
 ZK (born 2000 in Ishøj), stage name of Zaman Kilic,  a Danish rapper

Sport 
 Martin Christensen (born 1987 in Ishøj) a retired Danish professional footballer with over 250 club caps
 Camilla Kur Larsen (born 1989 in Ishøj) a Danish professional soccer player
 Riza Durmisi (born 1994 in Ishøj) a Danish professional footballer
 Ertuğrul Tekşen (born 2000 in Ishøj) a Danish-born Turkish footballer who plays for TFF Third League club Belediye Kütahyaspor
 Zidan Sertdemir (born 2005 in Ishøj) a Danish-born Turkish footballer who plays for Bayer Leverkusen

See also
 Listed buildings in Ishøj Municipality
 Benzonsdal
Ishøj Gymnasium

References

External links

Municipal seats in the Capital Region of Denmark
Municipal seats of Denmark
Copenhagen metropolitan area
Cities and towns in the Capital Region of Denmark
Ishøj Municipality

fr:Ishøj
no:Ishøj
pt:Ishøj